AB Logic was a Belgian Eurodance project arranged and produced by Jacko Bultinck and Peter Gillis in 1991. Its members included rapper K-Swing (Cedric Murril) and pop music vocalist Marianne Festraets. In 1992, they released the song "The Hitman". The same year, they released their self-titled debut album, which received a positive review from Alex Henderson of AllMusic. It fared much better on various mainland European pop charts than on the Billboard 200 album chart. They scored two minor Billboard Hot 100 hits in 1992 with "The Hitman" (#60) and "Get Up (Move Boy Move)" (#83). In Australia, "The Hitman" reached the top 10 on the ARIA singles chart in 1993, and was certified gold. Another charting single, "AB Logic", was released in 1993.

Although "The Hitman" never made the UK national charts, it was a regional hit in North East England, making the Top 20 of MRIB's chart for Metro Radio in that region.

Discography

Albums

Singles

References

Musical groups established in 1991
Musical groups disestablished in 1996
Belgian Eurodance groups
Belgian dance music groups
Hip house music groups
Eurodisco groups
1991 establishments in Belgium
1996 disestablishments in Belgium